Portrait of Agostino Barbarigo is an oil painting on canvas of 1571–72 by Paolo Veronese in the Cleveland Museum of Art, which bought it in 1928 from Italico Brass.

Its subject is Agostino Barbarigo, admiral of the Venetian fleet in Lepanto.

References

Bibliography
 
 
 

1570s paintings
Barbarigo
Paintings in the collection of the Cleveland Museum of Art
Oil on canvas paintings